John Brand may refer to:

John Brand (antiquarian) (1744–1806), English antiquarian and clergyman
John Brand (cricketer) (1790–1856), English amateur cricketer
John Brand (minister) (1668–1738), Scottish minister and author
John Henry Brand (1823–1888), South African lawyer and politician
John Brand (political writer) (d. 1808), English clergyman and political writer